Nihal Naj Ali Al-Awlaqi (alternative spellings: Nihal Naji Ali Al Awlaki, Nehal Al-Awlaqi) (born 1977) is a Yemeni lawyer. She was the Yemeni Minister of Legal Affairs from 9 January 2016 to 17 December 2020. In 2016 she received the International Women of Courage Award.

Life 

Al-Awlaqi is from the Shabwah Governorate in Yemen. She received a Bachelor of Legal Sciences, Master of Law and Doctor of Laws degrees from Mohammed V University in Morocco.  She speaks Arabic, English, and French.

Al-Awlaqi became an assistant law professor at the University of Aden, where she worked on research and training on the status of women. In 2013-14 she was a member of the State-Building Working Group of the National Dialogue Conference.  In March 2014 she was appointed a member of the constitution drafting committee (CDC),  and was subsequently elected deputy chair of the CDC. She was a member of the government negotiating team in Geneva.

In January 2016 she was announced as Minister of Legal Affairs. On September 9, 2016, Yemen President Abd Rabbo Mansour Hadi officially appointed al-Awaqi, then 39 years old, as Minister of Legal Affairs ( وزيراً للشؤون القانونية  ). She retained this role until 17 December 2020.

References

External links

 2016 International Women of Courage Awards, U.S. State Department photostream on Flickr 
Secretary's International Women of Courage Award (U.S. Department of State)

1977 births
Living people
Yemeni lawyers
Mohammed V University alumni
Women government ministers of Yemen
Recipients of the International Women of Courage Award
Legal Affairs ministers of Yemen
21st-century Yemeni politicians
21st-century Yemeni women politicians